GitHub, Inc. is an Internet hosting service for software development and version control using Git. It provides the distributed version control of Git plus access control, bug tracking, software feature requests, task management, continuous integration, and wikis for every project. Headquartered in California, it has been a subsidiary of Microsoft since 2018.

It is commonly used to host open source software development projects. As of January 2023, GitHub reported having over 100 million developers  and more than 372 million repositories, including at least 28 million public repositories. It is the largest source code host .

History

GitHub.com 
Development of the GitHub.com platform began on October 19, 2007. The site was launched in April 2008 by Tom Preston-Werner, Chris Wanstrath, P. J. Hyett and Scott Chacon after it had been made available for a few months prior as a beta release. GitHub has an annual keynote called GitHub Universe.

Organizational structure 
GitHub, Inc. was originally a flat organization with no middle managers; in other words, "everyone is a manager" (self-management). Employees could choose to work on projects that interested them (open allocation), but salaries were set by the chief executive.

In 2014, GitHub, Inc. introduced a layer of middle management amid harassment claims made against senior management. Tom Preston-Werner resigned as CEO amid the scandal.

Finance 
GitHub.com was a bootstrapped start-up business, which in its first years provided enough revenue to be funded solely by its three founders and start taking on employees. In July 2012, four years after the company was founded, Andreessen Horowitz invested $100 million in venture capital. In July 2015 GitHub raised another $250 million of venture capital in a series B round. Investors were Sequoia Capital, Andreessen Horowitz, Thrive Capital, and other venture capital funds. As of 2023, GitHub was estimated to be generating $1 billion in Annual Recurring Revenue.
The GitHub service was developed by Chris Wanstrath, P. J. Hyett, Tom Preston-Werner, and Scott Chacon using Ruby on Rails, and started in February 2008. The company, GitHub, Inc., has existed since 2007 and is located in San Francisco.

On February 24, 2009, GitHub announced that within the first year of being online, GitHub had accumulated over 46,000 public repositories, 17,000 of which were formed in the previous month. At that time, about 6,200 repositories had been forked at least once and 4,600 had been merged.

That same year, the site was used by over 100,000 users, according to GitHub, and had grown to host 90,000 unique public repositories, 12,000 having been forked at least once, for a total of 135,000 repositories.

In 2010, GitHub was hosting 1 million repositories. A year later, this number doubled. ReadWriteWeb reported that GitHub had surpassed SourceForge and Google Code in total number of commits for the period of January to May 2011. On January 16, 2013, GitHub passed the 3 million users mark and was then hosting more than 5 million repositories. By the end of the year, the number of repositories was twice as great, reaching 10 million repositories.

In 2012, GitHub raised $100 million in funding from Andreessen Horowitz with a $750 million valuation.  On July 29, 2015, GitHub stated it had raised $250 million in funding in a round led by Sequoia Capital. Other investors of that round included Andreessen Horowitz, Thrive Capital, and IVP (Institutional Venture Partners). The round valued the company at approximately $2 billion.

In 2015, GitHub opened an office in Japan, its first outside of the U.S. In 2016, GitHub was ranked No. 14 on the Forbes Cloud 100 list. It was not featured on the 2018, 2019, and 2020 lists.

On February 28, 2018, GitHub fell victim to the third-largest distributed denial-of-service (DDoS) attack in history, with incoming traffic reaching a peak of about 1.35 terabits per second.

On June 19, 2018, GitHub expanded its GitHub Education by offering free education bundles to all schools.

Acquisition by Microsoft 

From 2012, Microsoft became a significant user of GitHub, using it to host open-source projects and development tools such as .NET Core, Chakra Core, MSBuild, PowerShell, PowerToys, Visual Studio Code, Windows Calculator, Windows Terminal and the bulk of its product documentation (now to be found on Microsoft Docs).

On June 4, 2018, Microsoft announced its intent to acquire GitHub for US$7.5 billion. The deal closed on October 26, 2018. GitHub continued to operate independently as a community, platform and business. Under Microsoft, the service was led by Xamarin's Nat Friedman, reporting to Scott Guthrie, executive vice president of Microsoft Cloud and AI. GitHub's CEO, Chris Wanstrath, was retained as a "technical fellow," also reporting to Guthrie. Nat Friedman resigned November 3, 2021; he was replaced by Thomas Dohmke.

There have been concerns from developers Kyle Simpson, JavaScript trainer and author, and Rafael Laguna, CEO at Open-Xchange over Microsoft's purchase, citing uneasiness over Microsoft's handling of previous acquisitions, such as Nokia's mobile business and Skype.

This acquisition was in line with Microsoft's business strategy under CEO Satya Nadella, which has seen a larger focus on cloud computing services, alongside the development of and contributions to open-source software. Harvard Business Review argued that Microsoft was intending to acquire GitHub to get access to its user base, so it can be used as a loss leader to encourage the use of its other development products and services.

Concerns over the sale bolstered interest in competitors: Bitbucket (owned by Atlassian), GitLab and SourceForge (owned by BIZX, LLC) reported that they had seen spikes in new users intending to migrate projects from GitHub to their respective services.

In September 2019, GitHub acquired Semmle, a code analysis tool. In February 2020, GitHub launched in India under the name GitHub India Private Limited. In March 2020, GitHub announced that they were acquiring npm, a JavaScript packaging vendor, for an undisclosed sum of money. The deal was closed on April 15, 2020.

In early July 2020, the GitHub Archive Program was established, to archive its open-source code in perpetuity.

Mascot 
GitHub's mascot is an anthropomorphized "octocat" with five octopus-like arms. The character was created by graphic designer Simon Oxley as clip art to sell on iStock, a website that enables designers to market royalty-free digital images. GitHub became interested in Oxley's work after Twitter selected a bird that he designed for their own logo. The illustration GitHub chose was a character that Oxley had named Octopuss. Since GitHub wanted Octopuss for their logo (a use that the iStock license disallows), they negotiated with Oxley to buy exclusive rights to the image.

GitHub renamed Octopuss to Octocat, and trademarked the character along with the new name. Later, GitHub hired illustrator Cameron McEfee to adapt Octocat for different purposes on the website and promotional materials; McEfee and various GitHub users have since created hundreds of variations of the character, which are available on The Octodex.

Services 

Projects on GitHub.com can be accessed and managed using the standard Git command-line interface; all standard Git commands work with it. GitHub.com also allows users to browse public repositories on the site. Multiple desktop clients and Git plugins are also available. The site provides social networking-like functions such as feeds, followers, wikis (using wiki software called Gollum) and a social network graph to display how developers work on their versions ("forks") of a repository and what fork (and branch within that fork) is newest.

Anyone can browse and download public repositories but only registered users can contribute content to repositories. With a registered user account, users are able to have discussions, manage repositories, submit contributions to others' repositories, and review changes to code. GitHub.com began offering limited private repositories at no cost in January 2019 (limited to three contributors per project). Previously, only public repositories were free. On April 14, 2020, GitHub made "all of the core GitHub features" free for everyone, including "private repositories with unlimited collaborators."

The fundamental software that underpins GitHub is Git itself, written by Linus Torvalds, creator of Linux.  The additional software that provides the GitHub user interface was written using Ruby on Rails and Erlang by GitHub, Inc. developers Wanstrath, Hyett, and Preston-Werner.

Scope 
The main purpose of GitHub.com is to facilitate the version control and issue tracking aspects of software development. Labels, milestones, responsibility assignment, and a search engine are available for issue tracking. For version control, Git (and by extension GitHub.com) allows pull requests to propose changes to the source code. Users with the ability to review the proposed changes can see a diff of the requested changes and approve them. In Git terminology, this action is called "committing" and one instance of it is a "commit." A history of all commits is kept and can be viewed at a later time.

In addition, GitHub supports the following formats and features:
 Documentation, including automatically rendered README files in a variety of Markdown-like file formats (see )
Wikis
 GitHub Actions, which allows building continuous integration and continuous deployment pipelines for testing, releasing and deploying software without the use of third-party websites/platforms
 Graphs: pulse, contributors, commits, code frequency, punch card, network, members
 Integrations Directory
 Email notifications
 Discussions
 Option to subscribe someone to notifications by @ mentioning them.
 Emojis
 Nested task-lists within files
 Visualization of geospatial data
 3D render files that can be previewed using a new integrated STL file viewer that displays the files on a "3D canvas." The viewer is powered by WebGL and Three.js.
 Photoshop's native PSD format can be previewed and compared to previous versions of the same file.
 PDF document viewer
 Security Alerts of known Common Vulnerabilities and Exposures in different packages
GitHub's Terms of Service do not require public software projects hosted on GitHub to meet the Open Source Definition. The terms of service state, "By setting your repositories to be viewed publicly, you agree to allow others to view and fork your repositories."

GitHub Enterprise 
GitHub Enterprise is a self-managed version of GitHub.com with similar functionality. It can be run on an organization's own hardware or on a cloud provider, and it has been available since November 2011. In November 2020, source code for GitHub Enterprise Server was leaked online in an apparent protest against DMCA takedown of youtube-dl. According to GitHub, the source code came from GitHub accidentally sharing the code with Enterprise customers themselves, not from an attack on GitHub servers.

GitHub Pages 

Since 2008, GitHub has offered GitHub Pages, a static web hosting service for blogs, project documentation, and books.

All GitHub Pages content is stored in a Git repository, either as files served to visitors verbatim or in Markdown format. GitHub is integrated with Jekyll static website and blog generator and GitHub continuous integration pipelines. Each time the content source is updated, Jekyll regenerates the website and automatically serves it via GitHub Pages infrastructure.

As with the rest of GitHub, it includes both free and paid tiers of service. Websites generated through this service are hosted either as subdomains of the github.io domain, or can be connected to custom domains bought through a third-party domain name registrar.  GitHub Pages supports HTTPS encryption.

Gist 
GitHub also operates a pastebin-style site called Gist, which is for code snippets, as opposed to GitHub proper, which is for larger projects. Tom Preston-Werner débuted the feature at a Ruby conference in 2008.

Gist builds on the traditional simple concept of a pastebin by adding version control for code snippets, easy forking, and TLS encryption for private pastes. Because each "gist" is its own Git repository, multiple code snippets can be contained in a single page and they can be pushed and pulled using Git.

Unregistered users were able to upload Gists until March 19, 2018, when uploading gists was restricted to logged-in users, reportedly to mitigate spamming on the page of recent gists.

Gists' URLs use hexadecimal IDs, and edits to gists are recorded in a revision history, which can show the text difference of thirty revisions per page with an option between a "split" and "unified" view. Like repositories, Gists can be forked, "starred", i.e. publicly bookmarked, and commented on. The count of revisions, stars, and forks is indicated on the gist page.

Education program 
GitHub launched a new program called the GitHub Student Developer Pack to give students over the age of 13 free access to popular development tools and services. GitHub partnered with Bitnami, Crowdflower, DigitalOcean, DNSimple, HackHands, Namecheap, Orchestrate, Screenhero, SendGrid, Stripe, Travis CI, and Unreal Engine to launch the program.

In 2016, GitHub announced the launch of the GitHub Campus Experts program to train and encourage students to grow technology communities at their universities. The Campus Experts program is open to university students 18 years and older across the world. GitHub Campus Experts are one of the primary ways that GitHub funds student-oriented events and communities, Campus Experts are given access to training, funding, and additional resources to run events and grow their communities. To become a Campus Expert applicants must complete an online training course consisting of multiple modules designed to grow community leadership skills.

GitHub Marketplace service 
GitHub also provides some software as a service ("SaaS") integrations for adding extra features to projects. Those services include:
 Waffle.io: Project management for software teams. Automatically see pull requests, automated builds, reviews, and deployments across all of your repositories in GitHub.
 Rollbar: Integrate with GitHub to provide real-time debugging tools and full-stack exception reporting. It is compatible with all popular code languages, such as JavaScript, Python, .NET, Ruby, PHP, Node.js, Android, iOS, Go, Java, and C#.
 Codebeat: For automated code analysis specialized in web and mobile developers. The supported languages for this software are Elixir, Go, Java, Swift, JavaScript, Python, Ruby, Kotlin, Objective-C, and TypeScript.
 Travis CI: To provide confidence for your apps while doing test and ship. Also gives full control over the build environment, to adapt it to the code. Supported languages: Go, Java, JavaScript, Objective-C, Python, PHP, Ruby, and Swift.
 GitLocalize: Developed for teams that are translating their content from one point to another. GitLocalize automatically syncs with your repository so you can keep your workflow on GitHub. It also keeps you updated on what needs to be translated.

GitHub Sponsors 
GitHub Sponsors allows users to make monthly money donations to projects hosted on GitHub. The public beta was announced on May 23, 2019, and the project accepts waitlist registrations. The Verge said that GitHub Sponsors "works exactly like Patreon" because "developers can offer various funding tiers that come with different perks, and they'll receive recurring payments from supporters who want to access them and encourage their work" except with "zero fees to use the program." Furthermore, GitHub offers incentives for early adopters during the first year: it pledges to cover payment processing costs and match sponsorship payments up to $5,000 per developer. Furthermore, users still can use other similar services like Patreon and Open Collective and link to their own websites.

GitHub Archive Program
In July 2020, GitHub stored a February archive of the site in an abandoned mountain mine in Svalbard, Norway, part of the Arctic World Archive and not far from the Svalbard Global Seed Vault. The archive contained the code of all active public repositories, as well as that of dormant, but significant public repositories. The 21TB of data was stored on piqlFilm archival film reels as matrix (2D) barcode (Boxing barcode), and is expected to last 500–1,000 years.

The GitHub Archive Program is also working with partners on Project Silica, in an attempt to store all public repositories for 10,000 years.

Controversies

Harassment allegations 
In March 2014, GitHub programmer Julie Ann Horvath alleged that founder and CEO Tom Preston-Werner and his wife, Theresa, engaged in a pattern of harassment against her that led to her leaving the company. In April 2014, GitHub released a statement denying Horvath's allegations. However, following an internal investigation, GitHub confirmed the claims. GitHub's CEO Chris Wanstrath wrote on the company blog, "The investigation found Tom Preston-Werner in his capacity as GitHub's CEO acted inappropriately, including confrontational conduct, disregard of workplace complaints, insensitivity to the impact of his spouse's presence in the workplace, and failure to enforce an agreement that his spouse should not work in the office." Preston-Werner subsequently resigned from the company. The firm then announced it would implement new initiatives and trainings  "to make sure employee concerns and conflicts are taken seriously and dealt with appropriately."

Sanctions 
On July 25, 2019, a developer based in Iran wrote on Medium that GitHub had blocked his private repositories  and prohibited access to GitHub pages. Soon after, GitHub confirmed that it was now blocking developers in Iran, Crimea, Cuba, North Korea, and Syria from accessing private repositories. However, GitHub reopened access to GitHub Pages days later, for public repositories regardless of location. It was also revealed that using GitHub while visiting sanctioned countries could result in similar actions occurring on a user's account. GitHub responded to complaints and the media through a spokesperson, saying:

GitHub is subject to US trade control laws, and is committed to full compliance with applicable law. At the same time, GitHub's vision is to be the global platform for developer collaboration, no matter where developers reside. As a result, we take seriously our responsibility to examine government mandates thoroughly to be certain that users and customers are not impacted beyond what is required by law. This includes keeping public repositories services, including those for open source projects, available and accessible to support personal communications involving developers in sanctioned regions.

Developers who feel that they should not have restrictions can appeal for the removal of said restrictions, including those who only travel to, and do not reside in, those countries. GitHub has forbidden the use of VPNs and IP proxies to access the site from sanctioned countries, as purchase history and IP addresses are how they flag users, among other sources.

Censorship 
On December 4, 2014, Russia blacklisted GitHub.com because GitHub initially refused to take down user-posted suicide manuals. After a day, Russia withdrew its block, and GitHub began blocking specific content and pages in Russia. On December 31, 2014, India blocked GitHub.com along with 31 other websites over pro-ISIS content posted by users; the block was lifted three days later. On October 8, 2016, Turkey blocked GitHub to prevent email leakage of a hacked account belonging to the country's energy minister.

On March 26, 2015, a large-scale DDoS attack was launched against GitHub.com that lasted for just under five days. The attack, which appeared to originate from China, primarily targeted GitHub-hosted user content describing methods of circumventing Internet censorship.

On April 19, 2020, Chinese police detained Chen Mei and Cai Wei (volunteers for Terminus 2049, a project hosted on GitHub), and accused them of "picking quarrels and provoking trouble." Cai and Chen archived news articles, interviews, and other materials published on Chinese media outlets, and social media platforms that have been removed by censors in China.

ICE contract 
GitHub has a $200,000 contract with U.S. Immigration and Customs Enforcement (ICE) for the use of their on-site product GitHub Enterprise Server. This contract was renewed in 2019, despite internal opposition from many GitHub employees. In an email sent to employees, later posted to the GitHub blog on October 9, 2019, CEO Nat Friedman stated "The revenue from the purchase is less than $200,000 and not financially material for our company." He announced that GitHub had pledged to donate $500,000 to "nonprofit groups supporting immigrant communities targeted by the current administration." In response, at least 150 GitHub employees signed an open letter re-stating their opposition to the contract, and denouncing alleged human rights abuses by ICE. As of November 13, 2019, five workers had resigned over the contract.

The ICE contract dispute came into focus again in June 2020 due to the company's decision to abandon "master/slave" branch terminology, spurred by the George Floyd protests and Black Lives Matter movement. Detractors of GitHub describe the branch renaming to be a form of performative activism and have urged GitHub to cancel their ICE contract instead. An open letter from members of the open source community was shared on GitHub in December 2019, demanding that the company drop its contract with ICE and provide more transparency into how they conduct business and partnerships. The letter has been signed by more than 700 people.

Capitol riot comments and employee firing 
In January 2021, GitHub fired one of its employees after he expressed concern for colleagues as a violent mob stormed the U.S. Capitol, calling some of the rioters "Nazis." After an investigation, GitHub's COO said there were "significant errors of judgment and procedure" with the company's decision to fire the employee. As a result of the investigation, GitHub reached out to the employee, and the company's head of human resources resigned.

Criticism 
Linus Torvalds, the original developer of the Git software, has criticized the merging ability of the GitHub interface.

Developed projects 
 Atom, a free and open-source text and source code editor
 Electron, an open-source framework to use JavaScript-based websites as desktop applications.

See also 

 Collaborative innovation network
 Collaborative intelligence
 Commons-based peer production
 Comparison of source code hosting facilities
 DevOps
 Gitea
 GitLab
 Timeline of GitHub

Notes

References

External links 

 

 
2018 mergers and acquisitions
Bug and issue tracking software
Cloud computing providers
Collaborative projects
Computing websites
Cross-platform software
Git (software)
Internet properties established in 2002
Microsoft acquisitions
Microsoft subsidiaries
Microsoft websites
Open-source software hosting facilities
Project hosting websites
Project management software
Remote companies